Charis Scott (born 14 May 2002) is a Scottish cricketer. In May 2019, she was named in Scotland's squad for the 2019 ICC Women's Qualifier Europe tournament in Spain. She made her Women's Twenty20 International (WT20I) for Scotland against Germany on 29 June 2019. In August 2019, she was named in Scotland's squad for the 2019 Netherlands Women's Quadrangular Series. She played in Scotland's first match of the series, against Thailand on 8 August 2019.

In January 2022, she was named in Scotland's team for the 2022 Commonwealth Games Cricket Qualifier tournament in Malaysia.

References

External links
 

2002 births
Living people
Scottish women cricketers
Scotland women Twenty20 International cricketers
People from Galashiels